Xu Haofeng (born 27 January 1999) is a Chinese professional footballer who currently plays as a defender for Chinese Super League club Shenzhen F.C.

Club career
In July 2020, Xu was one of eight former Tianjin Tianhai players to sign with Shenzhen FC. He would go on to make his senior debut on 26 July 2020 in a league game against Guangzhou R&F in a 3-0 victory.

International career
On 20 July 2022, Xu made his international debut in a 3-0 defeat against South Korea in the 2022 EAFF E-1 Football Championship, as the Chinese FA decided to field the U-23 national team for this senior competition.

Career statistics

References

External links

1999 births
Living people
Chinese footballers
China youth international footballers
Association football defenders
Chinese Super League players
Shenzhen F.C. players